The Department of Finance is a department of the Government of Australia that is charged with the responsibility of assisting the government across a wide range of policy areas to ensure its outcomes are met, particularly with regard to expenditure, financial management, and the operations of government.

The administrative head of the department is the Secretary of the Department of Finance, presently Jenny Wilkinson,  who reports to the Federal Minister for Finance, presently Senator Katy Gallagher.

Unlike in many countries, Australia's Department of Finance does not deal with general economic policy, which is the responsibility of the Department of the Treasury. The Treasurer has a wider range of powers and responsibilities than the Minister for Finance, who has a comparatively narrower portfolio.

The head office of the department is located at One Canberra Avenue, in the Canberra suburb of Forrest. Formerly, it was located in the John Gorton Building, named after Australia's prime minister between 1968 and 1971.

History
The Department of Finance was formed by way of an Administrative Arrangements Order issued on 18 September 2013 and replaced the functions previously performed by the former Department of Finance and Deregulation. In an earlier reconstruction, the department was called the Department of Finance and Administration.

Preceding departments
Department of Finance (7 December 1976 – 9 October 1997)
Department of Administrative Services (30 January 1994 – 9 October 1997)
Department of Finance and Administration (9 October 1997 – 3 December 2007)
Department of Finance and Deregulation (3 December 2007 – 18 September 2013)

Operational activities
In the 18 September 2013 Administrative Arrangements Order, the functions of the department were broadly classified into the following matters:
 Budget policy advice and process, and review of governmental programs
 Government financial accountability, governance and financial management frameworks, including grants and procurement policy and services
 Shareholder advice on Government Business Enterprises (GBEs) and commercial entities treated as GBEs
 General policy guidelines for Commonwealth statutory authorities
 Superannuation arrangements for Australian Government civilian employees and members of parliament and retirement benefits for Federal Judges and Governors-General
 Asset sales
 Commonwealth property policy framework, legislation and policy for the management of property leased or owned by the Commonwealth, including acquisition, disposal and management of property interests
 Management of non-Defence Commonwealth property in Australia, including construction, major refurbishment, sustainability, acquisition, ownership and disposal of real property
 Electoral matters (through the Australian Electoral Commission)
 Administration of the Australian Government’s self-managed general insurance fund (Comcover)
 Government on-line delivery and information technology and communications management
 Policy advice on the Future Fund and Nation-building Funds and authorisation of payments from the Nation-building Funds to Agencies
 Co-ordination of Government Advertising
 Official Establishments, ownership and property management of the Prime Minister's official residences

See also

 Australian federal budget
 Financial Management and Accountability Act
 List of Australian Commonwealth Government entities
 Minister for Finance

References

Finance
Australia
Australia, Finance
2013 establishments in Australia
Government finances in Australia